Henri Félix Emmanuel Philippoteaux (3 April 1815 – 8 November 1884) was a French artist and illustrator, known primarily as a battle painter.

Life and works
He was born in Paris, France, studied art at the studio of Léon Cogniet, and first exhibited his work at the Paris Salon of 1833.

One of his best-known works was a depiction of the Siege of Paris during the Franco-Prussian War, painted in the form of a cyclorama, a type of large panoramic painting on the inside of a cylindrical platform designed to provide a viewer standing in the middle of the cylinder with a 360° view of the painting. Viewers surrounded by the panoramic image are meant to feel as if they are standing in the midst of a historic event or famous place.

Philippoteaux also produced a large number of works chronicling the rise and successes of Napoleon Bonaparte, including a portrait of Napoleon in his regimental uniform and a group of paintings of French victories in the Napoleonic Wars.  Philippoteaux was awarded the Légion d'honneur in 1846.

Philippoteaux's son Paul Philippoteaux was also an artist; both were famous for their production of cycloramas.  Father and son collaborated on The Defence of the Fort d'Issy in 1871.  They also collaborated on a cyclorama of the Battle of Gettysburg that became a celebrated work in the United States:"One cyclorama, however, halted the slide in popularity, and almost single-handedly revived the public's interest in the medium for another decade...this singular creation was initially painted in 1882-83 by Henry F. Philippoteaux and Paul Philippoteaux, a father and son team of French artists...within a year, half a million people had stood before it."

Father and son enhanced the artistic effect of their cylindrical painting by adding a third dimension, including elements of diorama placed in front of the painting, and by incorporating sections of walls and battlefield objects that blended into the painted parts of the presentation.

He died in 1884 in Paris and his obituary in the New York Times appeared on November 10, 1884.

Partial list of works

Les Gentilshommes du Duc d'Orléans
The Iceberg, Episode of the Wars of America (1833)
The Retreat from Moscow (1835)
The Capture of Ypres (1837)
Death of Turenne
The Siege of Antwerp in 1792
Colonel Fr. Ponsonby rescued on the battlefield of Waterloo, by a French Officer
They are in our House (1880)
The Periwinkle
The Deception
The Blade of Grass
The Return from the Dram-shop (1853)
The Battle of the Raab
The Passage of the Tagliamento
The Siege of Antwerp in 1832

References

External links
 Gallery of Philippoteaux works at New York Public Library
 Philippoteaux's The Siege of Paris cyclorama
 Panorama of the Defence of Paris, 1875 work at google books
 Partial list of his oil paintings

1815 births
1884 deaths
19th-century French painters
French male painters
19th-century French male artists